IPSW, iPhone Software, is a file format used to install iOS, iPadOS, tvOS, HomePod, and most recently, macOS firmware for devices equipped with Apple silicon. All Apple devices share the same IPSW file format for iOS firmware and their derivatives, allowing users to flash their devices through Finder or iTunes on macOS or Windows, respectively. Users can flash Apple silicon Macs through Apple Configurator 2.

Structure
The .ipsw file itself is a compressed archive file (renamed Zip archive) containing at least three Apple Disk Image files with one containing the root file system of the OS and two ram disks for restore and update. tvOS, audioOS and macOS also include a disk image for the recovery environment (recoveryOS).

The file also holds the kernel caches, and a "Firmware" folder which contains iBoot, LLB (Low-Level Bootloader), iBSS (iBoot Single Stage), iBEC (iBoot Epoch Change), the Secure Enclave Processor firmware, the Device Tree, Firmware Images (Apple logo, battery images, Recovery mode screen and more), baseband firmware files in .bbfw format (renamed zip file), and other firmware files.

There are two more files named "BuildManifest.plist" and "Restore.plist", both property lists that contain compatibility information and SHA-256 hashes for different components.

BuildManifest.plist is sent to Apple's TSS server and checked in order to obtain SHSH blobs before every restore. Without SHSH blobs, the device will refuse to restore, thus making downgrades very difficult to achieve.

Security and rooting

The archive is not password-protected, but iBoot, LLB, iBEC, iBSS, iBootData and the Secure Enclave Processor firmware images inside it are encrypted with AES. Until iOS 10, all the firmware files (including the root file system and Restore and Update ramdisks) were encrypted. While Apple does not release these keys, they can be extracted using different iBoot or bootloader exploits, such as limera1n (created by George Hotz, more commonly known as geohot). Since then, many tools were created for the decryption and modification of the root file system.

Government data access

After the 2015 San Bernardino attack, the FBI recovered the shooter's iPhone 5C, which belonged to the San Bernardino County Department of Public Health. The FBI recovered iCloud backups from one and a half months before the shooting, and wanted to access encrypted files on the device. The U.S. government ordered Apple to produce an IPSW file that would allow investigators to brute force the passcode of the iPhone. The order used the All Writs Act, originally created  by the Judiciary Act of 1789, to demand the firmware, in the same way as other smartphone manufacturers have been ordered to comply.

Tim Cook responded on the company's webpage, outlining a need for encryption, and arguing that if they produce a backdoor for one device, it would inevitably be used to compromise the privacy of other iPhone users:

References

External links
 iPSW at Apple Support
 iPSW at File Extensions
 iPSW at The iPhone Wiki
 BASEBAND files at The iPhone Wiki

IOS
Computer file formats
Archive formats